The Pangani robber (Rhabdalestes tangensis) is a species of fish in the family Alestidae. It is found in the Tanga and Pangani River drainages, including Lake Jipe, in Tanzania and Kenya. Its natural habitats are rivers and lagoons.

References

Fish described in 1907
Taxa named by Einar Lönnberg
Freshwater fish of Kenya
Fish of Tanzania
Rhabdalestes
Taxonomy articles created by Polbot